The Wondreb is a river in Bavaria, Germany and Karlovy Vary Region, Czech Republic. It flows into the Ohře (Eger) near the village Odrava.

See also
List of rivers of Bavaria

References

Rivers of the Karlovy Vary Region
Rivers of Bavaria
Rivers of the Upper Palatine Forest
Rivers of Germany
International rivers of Europe